Muschampia baeticus, the southern marbled skipper, is a butterfly of the  family Hesperiidae. It is found in North Africa, south-western Europe, Italy and Anatolia up to Afghanistan.

The length of the forewings is 13–14 mm. Adults are on wing from May to October in two or three generations. On higher altitudes there is only one generation.

The larvae feed on Marrubium vulgare and Ballota species.

This species was formerly a member of the genus Carcharodus. As a result of genomic research published in 2020, it was transferred to the genus Muschampia.

References

External links
 Lepiforum.de
 Moths and Butterflies of Europe and North Africa

Carcharodus
Butterflies of Europe
Taxa named by Jules Pierre Rambur
Butterflies described in 1842